You All Infuriate Me is a Russian TV series which debuted in 2017 on the STS channel.

Plot 
Sonia Bagretsova is a restaurant reviewer in the famous magazine NOWADAYS in the city of Yekaterinburg. She is a misanthrope who is annoyed by everything and gets into arguments with anyone who crosses her path. Sonia does not know strong friendship nor true love.

One day Sonya visits the opening of one restaurant and treats herself to an alcoholic drink which causes her to become more sociable. This causes her personal life to change dramatically: the journalist gains a lover and two friends.

Cast
 Svetlana Khodchenkova as Sonia Bagretsova / Sofya
 Yuliya Topolnitskaya as Nelya Suslova / Ninel
 Aleksandr Pal as Vova / Vladimir
 Alexander Petrov as Mark Kalinin
 Pyotr Fyodorov as Kirill Vitalievich
 Yuri Kolokolnikov as Artem
 Yuri Chursin as Alexander
 Igor Petrenko as Nikita

References

External links 
 
 

STS (TV channel) original programming
2010s Russian television series
2017 Russian television series debuts
Russian television sitcoms